The Smith-Bontura-Evans-House, also known as Evansview and as Bontura, is a historic house and business built by Robert D. Smith in Natchez, Mississippi. A free African American, Smith built the combined building for his livery business and a Greek Revival residence between 1851 and 1858. It was listed on the National Register of Historic Places on March 29, 1978.

In 1977 the property was owned by the Natchez Town chapter of the National Society of the Colonial Dames of America.

See also
 List of African-American historic places in Mississippi

References

Houses in Natchez, Mississippi
Houses on the National Register of Historic Places in Mississippi
National Register of Historic Places in Natchez, Mississippi
African-American history of Mississippi